Auguste was a 50-gun ship of the line of the French Navy. Captured by HMS Portland on 9 February 1746 during the War of the Austrian Succession, she was taken into Royal Navy service as HMS Portland's Prize.

References

Ships of the line of France
Ships of the line of the Royal Navy
Captured ships